Randolf "Randy" Siongco David (born January 8, 1946) is a Filipino journalist, sociologist, and public intellectual. He is a professor emeritus of sociology at the University of the Philippines Diliman. He currently pens a weekly newspaper column for the Philippine Daily Inquirer, as well as being as one of the board of directors of the media conglomerate ABS-CBN Corporation.

Early life and education
David was born in Guagua, Pampanga on January 8, 1946, to Pedro S. David and Bienvenita S. David (1922–2000), with 12 siblings. He obtained a Bachelor of Arts degree, major in Sociology, from the University of the Philippines Diliman in 1965. He also pursued doctoral studies at the University of Manchester, though he opted not to complete them and chose instead to remain as socialist liberal in the Philippines during the martial law government of President Ferdinand Marcos.

Career
A longtime professor in the Department of Sociology of the University of the Philippines Diliman, David first came into widespread prominence in 1986, when he accepted an offer by the Intercontinental Broadcasting Corporation to host a public affairs talk show on IBC-13. The show, named Truth Forum, was notable as the only public affairs talk show during its time that was conducted in Filipino, rather than English. David later joined the newly re-established Associated Broadcasting Company as a newscaster and the host of a new talk show, Public Life with Randy David. After leaving the network in 1995, David hosted Public Life for GMA Network, and until 2003, Off the Record (with Katrina Legarda) for ABS-CBN, his last regular hosting stint to date. Since 1995, his newspaper column, Public Lives, has appeared every Sunday on the pages of the Philippine Daily Inquirer.

On February 25, 2006, David was arrested in Santolan, Quezon City while celebrating the 20th anniversary of the first People Power Revolution. The reason for the arrest was the lack of permit to rally, President Gloria Macapagal Arroyo having revoked all permits after she declared a state of national emergency just a few hours earlier. He was later released with all charges dropped. In May 2006, the Supreme Court declared that the arrests of David and his co-detainees were invalid.

David expressed interest in running for a congressional seat in Pampanga should Gloria Macapagal Arroyo run for Congresswoman in the 2010 general elections, a fight that has been dubbed by several Senators and mediamen as "David vs. Gloriath". David later chose not to run, and Arroyo was elected to the seat in May 2010.

Personal life
David is married to Karina Constantino-David who served until 2008 as the Chairperson of the Civil Service Commission (CSC) of the Philippines. The couple has four children, including broadcast journalist Kara David, UP National Institute of Geological Sciences (NIGS) professor Dr. Carlos Primo David, Nadya Melina David and Jika David. The Bishop of Kalookan, the Most Reverend Pablo Virgilio David, D.D. is his younger brother. David is also the son-in-law of the historian Renato Constantino.

References

External links

1946 births
Living people
People from Pampanga
Kapampangan people
University of the Philippines Diliman alumni
Filipino columnists
Filipino educators
Filipino sociologists
Sociology educators
Filipino television journalists
Filipino political commentators
Filipino television presenters
Intercontinental Broadcasting Corporation people
IBC News and Public Affairs people
TV5 (Philippine TV network) personalities
News5 people
GMA Network personalities
GMA Integrated News and Public Affairs people
ABS-CBN personalities
ABS-CBN people
Philippine Daily Inquirer people